The New Delta Review is a literary magazine in the United States in print since 1984 and online since 2012.  The journal is published biannually with the support of Louisiana State University.

See also
 List of literary magazines

References

External links
Official website

1984 establishments in Louisiana
Biannual magazines published in the United States
Louisiana State University
Magazines established in 1984
Magazines published in Louisiana
Mass media in Baton Rouge, Louisiana
Online literary magazines published in the United States
Online magazines published in the United States